Geli may refer to:

 Geli Raubal (1908–1931), a niece of Adolf Hitler
 Ángel de Juana García, aka Geli (born 1968), a Spanish football player
 Geli, Iran
 Geli, Republic of Dagestan, Russia
 geli (software), a disk encryption system written for FreeBSD